This list of mines in Japan is subsidiary to the list of mines article and lists working, defunct and future mines in the country and is organised by the primary mineral output.

Card of mines of Japan

List of mines

References

 
Japan
Coal mines
Japan